In game theory, asynchrony occurs when gameplay does not proceed in consistently paced rounds. A system is synchronous if agents in a game move in lockstep according to a global timing system, whereas "in an asynchronous system, there is no global clock. The agents in the system can run at arbitrary rates relative to each other."

External links
Abraham, I., Alvisi, L., & Halpern, J. Y. (2011). Distributed computing meets game theory: combining insights from two fields. Acm Sigact News, 42(2), 69–76.

Ben-Or, M. (1983). Another Advantage of Free Choice: Completely Asynchronous Agreement Protocols. In Proc. 2nd ACM Symp. on Principles of Distributed Computing, pp. 27–30.

Solodkin, L., & Oshman, R. (2021). Truthful Information Dissemination in General Asynchronous Networks. In 35th International Symposium on Distributed Computing (DISC 2021). Schloss Dagstuhl-Leibniz-Zentrum für Informatik. https://drops.dagstuhl.de/opus/volltexte/2021/14839/pdf/LIPIcs-DISC-2021-37.pdf

Yifrach, A., & Mansour, Y. (2018, July). Fair leader election for rational agents in asynchronous rings and networks. In Proceedings of the 2018 ACM Symposium on Principles of Distributed Computing (pp. 217-226). https://arxiv.org/pdf/1805.04778.pdf

References  

Game theory